is a Japanese artistic gymnast. Born in Gunma, Japan, he graduated from Nippon Sport Science University and later join Tokushukai Gymnastics Club. Takeda was part of Japan men's national gymnastics team that won the gold medal at 2014 Asian Games.

See also 
 Japan men's national gymnastics team
 List of Asian Games medalists in gymnastics

References

External links 
 Kazuyuki Takeda at FIG website

Japanese male artistic gymnasts
Sportspeople from Gunma Prefecture
Living people
1992 births
Gymnasts at the 2014 Asian Games
Medalists at the 2014 Asian Games
Asian Games gold medalists for Japan
Asian Games silver medalists for Japan
Asian Games medalists in gymnastics
21st-century Japanese people